George Atwood  ( – 11 July 1807) was an English mathematician who invented the Atwood machine for illustrating the effects of Newton's laws of motion. He was also a renowned chess player whose skill for recording many games of his own and of other players, including François-André Danican Philidor, the leading master of his time, left a valuable historical record for future generations.

Atwood was born in Westminster, with the date remaining unknown, but presumed to have been shortly before his baptism on 15 October 1745. He attended Westminster School, and in 1765, was admitted to Trinity College, Cambridge. He graduated in 1769, with the rank of third wrangler and was awarded the inaugural  first Smith's Prize. Subsequently, he became a fellow and a tutor of the college. In 1776, he was elected a fellow of the Royal Society of London.

In 1784, he left Cambridge and soon afterwards received from William Pitt the Younger the office of patent searcher of the customs, which required but little attendance, enabling him to devote a considerable portion of his time to mathematics and physics.

Atwood died unmarried in Westminster at the age of 61, and was buried there at St. Margaret's Church. Over a century later, a lunar crater was renamed Atwood in his honour.

Selected publications

Atwood's published works, exclusive of papers contributed to the Philosophical Transactions, for one of which he obtained the Copley Medal, are as follows:
 
 Analysis of a Course of Lectures on the Principles of Natural Philosophy (Cambridge, 1784).
 Treatise on the Rectilinear Motion and Rotation of Bodies (Cambridge, 1784), which gives some interesting experiments, by means of which mechanical truths can be ocularly exhibited and demonstrated, and describes the machine, since named after Atwood, for verifying experimentally the laws of simple acceleration of motion.
 Review of the Statutes and Ordinances of Assize which have been established in England from the 4th year of King John, 1202, to the 37th of his present Majesty (London, 1801), a work of some historical research.
 Dissertation on the Construction and Properties of Arches (London, 1801).
 Chess games recorded by Atwood were published posthumously by George Walker in London in 1835, under the name Selection of Games at Chess, actually played by Philidor and his Contemporaries. Atwood was one of a few masters that could beat Verdoni on occasion.

References

External links

 
 

1745 births
1807 deaths
English inventors
People from Westminster
British chess players
Alumni of Trinity College, Cambridge
Fellows of Trinity College, Cambridge
Fellows of the Royal Society
People educated at Westminster School, London
Recipients of the Copley Medal
18th-century English people
18th-century English mathematicians
19th-century English mathematicians
19th-century chess players